The term Sudanese Civil War refers to at least three separate conflicts:
First Sudanese Civil War (1955–1972)
Second Sudanese Civil War (1983–2005)
South Sudanese Civil War (2013–2020)
It could also refer to other internal conflicts in Sudan and South Sudan:
Lord's Resistance Army insurgency (1987–present)
War in Darfur (2003–present)
Sudanese nomadic conflicts (2012)
Ethnic violence in South Sudan
Sudanese conflict in South Kordofan and Blue Nile (2011–2020)
As well as conflicts between Sudan and South Sudan after the breakup:
Heglig Crisis (2012)

See also 
 Mahdist War (1881–1899)